The ninth season of Skal vi danse? started on September 14, 2013.

Couples

Scoring chart

Highest and lowest scoring performances of the series 
The best and worst performances in each dance according to the judges' marks are as follows:

Average chart

Dance schedule
The celebrities and professional partners danced one of these routines for each corresponding week.
 Week 1: Waltz or Cha-Cha-Cha
 Week 2: Tango or Paso Doble 
 Week 3: Samba or Slowfox
 Week 4: Jive
 Week 5: Quickstep or Rumba
 Week 6: One unlearned dance & Team Jive
 Week 7: One unlearned dance & Team Viennese Waltz
 Week 8: Showdance, Bollywood or Argentine Tango & Team Salsa
 Week 9: One unlearned dance, one repeated dance 
 Week 10: One unlearned dance, Fusion & Bonus-point
 Week 11: One ballroom dance, one Latin dance, Showdance

Songs

Week 1

Running order

Week 2

Running order

Week 3

Running order

Week 4

Running order

Week 5

Running order

Week 6

Running order

Call-out Order
The table below lists the order in which the contestants' fates were revealed. The order of the safe couples doesn't reflect the viewer voting results.

 This couple came in first place with the judges.
 This couple came in last place with the judges.
 This couple came in last place with the judges and was eliminated.
 This couple was eliminated.
 This couple came in last place with the judges and was not eliminated.
 This couple withdrew from the competition.
 This couple won the competition.
 This couple came in second in the competition.

Dance chart

See also
Skal vi danse?
Skal vi danse? (season 4)
Skal vi danse? (season 5)
Skal vi danse? (season 6)
Skal vi danse? (season 7)
Skal vi danse? (season 8)
Dancing with the Stars International Versions

References

External links

2013 Norwegian television seasons
Skal vi danse?